The Nieuwe Republiek ("New Republic") was a small Boer republic which existed from 1884 to 1888 in present-day South Africa.
It was recognised only by Germany and the South African Republic. Its independence was proclaimed on August 16, 1884, with land donated by the Zulu Kingdom through a treaty. It covered  and the capital was Vryheid or Vrijheid ("Freedom" in Afrikaans or Dutch, respectively), both being alternative names of the state. The founder and president until it requested incorporation into the South African Republic on 20 July 1888 was Lucas Johannes Meyer, while Daniel Johannes Esselen acted as Secretary of State during the same period.

History 
After Boer farmers, who lived in the area, helped Dinuzulu defeat his rival Zibhebhu for succession of the Zulu throne, land was given to them by way of cession by the new Zulu king along the banks of the Mfolozi River. On August 5, 1884, the Boers formed the Nieuwe Republiek (New Republic) with recognition by Germany, Zuid-Afrikaanse Republiek (ZAR) and Portugal with Vryheid as its capital. The Nieuwe Republiek was finally recognized by the British on October 22, 1886 but within a few months the British annexed a stretch of the coastline of the Nieuwe Republiek and the Zulu Kingdom north of the river Thukela river (1887) in order to prevent the new Boer republic from having access to the sea, which they needed for a harbor.

British annexation of the Zulu territory resulted in a revolt, led by Dinuzulu (June 1888), who was defeated by the British. King Dinuzulu was tried for high treason in Eshowe and sentenced. The annexation of Zululand did not leave much hope for security in the Nieuwe Republiek against British imperialism. On July 20, 1888, the New Republic was incorporated with the Transvaal Republic on its own request, although enjoying considerable autonomy. The relations between the Boers and the Zulu remained stable until the outbreak of the Second Boer War (1899-1902).

In June 1900 the British forces entered Vryheid, the capital. Arthur Jesse Shepstone (Maritzburg, 8 November 1852-1912), son of Sir Theophilus Shepstone, the former secretary of native affairs in the British Colony of Natal, was sent to the area and worked together with the official British military intelligence J. Roberts to conspire with some Zulus against the Boers, and had victory achieved over the Boers in Schurweberg, near Vryheid. In March 1901 he declared martial law in the region. After the Second Boer War the territory was transferred to the British Colony of Natal (1903).

Gallery

References

1844 establishments in South Africa
Populated places established in 1844
Populated places founded by Afrikaners
History of Transvaal
Former republics